Recipe Markup Language, formerly known as DESSERT (Document Encoding and Structuring Specification for Electronic Recipe Transfer), is an XML-based format for marking up recipes. The format was created in 2000 by the company FormatData.

The format provides detailed markup for defining ingredients, which facilitates automated conversions from one type of measurement to another. The markup language also provides for step-based instructions. Metadata can be added to a RecipeML document through the Dublin Core.

Software programs that read and write the RecipeML format include Largo Recipes.

External links

XML-based standards
XML markup languages